Emily Pogorelc is an American operatic soprano. She is a member of the Bavarian State Opera in Munich, and has performed leading roles internationally.

Life 
Born in Milwaukee, Pogorelc studied at the Curtis Institute of Music in Philadelphia, graduating in 2018. She won the Ginette Theano Prize for Most Promising Talent at the first Glyndebourne Festival Opera competition in 2018. Pogorelc made her debut as Cunegonde in Bernstein's Candide at the Washington National Opera. She then took part in the Mozart Académie of the Aix-en-Provence Festival, and at the Britten-Pears Young Artist Programme of the Aldeburgh Festival. She performed at the Glimmerglass Festival, as Romilda in Handel's Serse as Berenice in Rossini's L'occasione fa il ladro, and as Johanna in Sondheim's Sweeney Todd. Pogorelc was a member of the Ryan Opera Center at the Lyric Opera of Chicago, where she appeared as Ilia in Mozart's Idomeneo, Zerlina in Don Giovanni, and the Voice of the Forest Bird and Woglinde in Wagner's Der Ring des Nibelungen. She performed several small roles at the Lyric Opera.

Pogorelc became a member of the Bavarian State Opera in 2020, where her first role was Zaunschlüpfer in Die Vögel by Walter Braunfels, followed by Gretel in Humperdinck's Hänsel und Gretel, Sofia in Rossini's Il signor Bruschino, Adina in Donizetti's L'elisir d'amore, Musetta in Puccini's La bohème, and Najade in Ariadne auf Naxos by Richard Strauss. She appeared as Cherubino in Mozart's Le nozze di Figaro as part of the 2021 Munich Opera Festival. She performed there as Lauretta in a 2021 revival of a 2017 production of Puccini's Gianni Schicchi, directed by Lotte de Beer and conducted Bertrand de Billy, alongside Ambrogio Maestri in the title role, and a reviewer noted that her beautiful rendition of "O mio babbino caro" "stopped the show". She won a third prize at the Operalia competition in 2021.

References

External links 
 
 Emily Pogorelc / Sopran operabase.com
 Emily Pogorelc / Soprano (management) centrestagemanagement.com 2022
 Emily Pogorelc (interview) Queen Sonja International Music Competition

American operatic sopranos
Living people
Musicians from Milwaukee
21st-century American women opera singers
Curtis Institute of Music alumni
Year of birth missing (living people)
American emigrants to Germany